Evis Jennings (born July 11, 1955) is an American retired sprinter.  Running for Mississippi State University, he was the 1976 NCAA Indoor Champion at 440 yards.

He contested the 400 m at the 1976 United States Olympic Trials and finished seventh. His personal record for the distance was 45.4 seconds, which ranked him 11th fastest in the world in the 1974 season.

International competitions

References

1955 births
Living people
American male sprinters
Place of birth missing (living people)
Universiade gold medalists for the United States
Universiade medalists in athletics (track and field)
Mississippi State Bulldogs men's track and field athletes